Polaroid Corp. v. Polarad Elect. Corp. is a key United States legal case from 1961 in trademark infringement law. It is also cited in personality rights particularly around celebrities. The decision argued that trademark infringement is measured by the multi-factor "likelihood of confusion" test. That is, a new mark will infringe on an existing trademark if the new mark is so similar to the original that consumers are likely to confuse the two marks, and mistakenly purchase from the wrong company.

The likelihood of confusion test turns on several factors, including:
 Strength of the plaintiff's trademark
 Degree of similarity between the two marks at issue
 Similarity of the goods and services at issue
 Evidence of actual confusion
 Purchaser sophistication
 Quality of the defendant's goods or services
 Defendant's intent in adopting the mark

This multi-factor test was articulated by Judge Henry Friendly in Polaroid v. Polarad. The criteria are often referred to as the "Polaroid factors."

See also
 List of trademark case law
 Trademark infringement
 Personality rights
 Concurrent use registration ("DuPont factors")

References 

1961 in American law
United States trademark case law
Polaroid Corporation